Dorcadion pilosellum is a species of beetle in the family Cerambycidae. It was described by Kraatz in 1873. It is known from Greece. It contains the varietas Dorcadion pilosellum var. obscurimembre.

References

pilosellum
Beetles described in 1873